Daddy's Boy is a 1989 book by Chris Elliott.

Daddy's Boy may also refer to:

"Daddy's Boy" (House), a television episode
Daddy's Boy, a 1909 children's book by L. T. Meade
Daddy's Boy, an LGBT-themed film featured in The Click List: Best in Short Film
"Daddy's Boy", a song by Killdozer from their 1995 album God Hears Pleas of the Innocent